Innis Mhòr is a tidal island in the Dornoch Firth of Easter Ross off the east coast of Scotland. It has almost certainly never been permanently inhabited.

Scotland's north and west coasts have over 700 islands all told. Innis Mhòr  is one of the few east coast islands, only 4 of which exceed  in size.

The extensive tidal Whiteness Sands lie between Innis Mhòr and the Easter Ross coast, with the headland of Rubh' na h-Innse Moire lying to the west of the island. Inland there is the Morrich More, an extensive area of dune grassland with wetland communities,  and a grade 1 SSSI, and RAF Tain, a bombing range on an alluvial plain known as the Fendom. The area includes the most extensive area of salt marsh in the Highlands. The island is part of the Dornoch Firth National Scenic Area, one of 40 in Scotland.

Local birdlife includes important populations of osprey (10 pairs representing about 10% of the UK breeding population), bar-tailed godwit, greylag goose and wigeon and numerous more common species such as curlew, dunlin, oystercatcher and teal.

There are no other islands nearby, although a sandy spit to the south is marked as Innis Bheag (meaning "small island") on some maps and is also referred to as Paterson Island.

References
 
 Road Atlas of Britain (1978)  London; Bartholomew.

Notes

Uninhabited islands of Highland (council area)